Can't Wait All Night is the sixth solo studio album by American pop and country singer Juice Newton, released by RCA Records in 1984. The album was produced by Richard Landis and is Newton's last studio album to chart on the Billboard 200, reaching #128.

Overview
Can't Wait All Night marked the end of Newton's run on the pop charts, as it contains her last two songs to date to chart on the Billboard Hot 100: "A Little Love", which peaked at #44, and the edgy Bryan Adams-written and produced title track, which peaked at #66. Both songs were aided by popular music videos. The former is also Newton's most recent Top 10 hit on the Adult Contemporary chart, peaking at #7. Her next album, Old Flame, would mark Newton's return full-force to the country music charts.

The album was re-issued on CD by Wounded Bird in 2007.

Critical reception
Jim Allen of AllMusic retrospectively gave the album two out of five stars and wrote that "In the wake of Juice Newton's massive success with her country-pop sound in the early 1980s, she started fiddling with the formula" adding that "while the experimentation process failed to keep her in the charts, it did send her down some different stylistic routes, like the glossy, rock-tinged sound of the album's lead-off cut, "A Little Love," which was the closest thing to a hit on the album."

Track listing

Personnel

Juice Newton – lead and background vocals
Mike Baird – drums
Dennis Belfield – bass guitar
George Doering – guitar; keyboards
Dann Huff – guitar
Fred Tackett – guitar
Kevin Dukes – guitar
Alan Pasqua – keyboards
Reed Nielsen – keyboards
Richard Gibbs – keyboards
Jim Lang – Hammond organ
Joe Peskin – saxophone
Otha Young – percussion
Richard Landis – percussion
Tom Kelly – backing vocals
Tom Funderbunk – backing vocals
Bill Champlin – backing vocals
Andrew Gold – backing vocals
Kenny Edwards – backing vocals
Greg Prestopino – backing vocals
Gary Durrett – backing vocals
Maxine Anderson – backing vocals
Linda McCrary – backing vocals
Lisa Roberts – backing vocals
Howard Smith – backing vocals
Phyllis St. James – backing vocals
Jon Joyce – backing vocals

References

External links

1984 albums
Juice Newton albums
Albums produced by Richard Landis
RCA Records albums
Wounded Bird Records albums